The rue Royale is a short street in Paris, France, running between the Place de la Concorde and the Place de la Madeleine (site of the Church of the Madeleine). The rue Royale is in the city's 8th arrondissement.

Among the well-known addresses on this street is that of Maxim's restaurant, at number 3.

On 12 August 1843, the rue Royale was the scene for a bizarre phenomenon, when tens of thousands of butterflies landed, causing chaos and swarming the shops and restaurants. The pillars of the Madeleine were, reportedly, "covered".

See also 
Rue Royale, the city of Lyon
Rue Royale, the city of Brussels

References